J. T. Holden is an American author and poet of British descent, best known for his fluid use of rhyming poetry and clever syntax. His ambitious literary debut, Alice in Verse: The Lost Rhymes of Wonderland, offered a unique and refreshing take on Lewis Carroll's oft-adapted tale. Written entirely in rhyming verse, with a canny ear for Carroll's dialect, rhythm, and structure, the book follows Alice's Adventures in Wonderland (with "A Slight Detour Through the Looking-Glass").

Standing in contrast to his rhyming poetry is his first novel, The Boys From Manchester, a coming of age story that center on two teenage boys with superpowers. What sets The Boys From Manchester apart from other superhero novels (and movies) is the starkly realistic manner in which Holden approaches the subject matter, as a character-driven story that gradually builds into an explosive action tale in the final third of the book. That the main characters are gay teens who do not fall into stereotype and are not portrayed as victims but as heroes is a real step forward in Young Adult Fiction.

Other novels include: JB: Or the Unexpected Virtue of Being Swaggy (also published under the title The Curious Disappearance of JB), Three Imaginary Boys, Apple-polisher, and the political satire/thriller True Son.

Other books of rhyming poetry include: Twilight Tales: A Collection of Chilling Poems, O The Dark Things You'll See! (a spooky parody of the Dr. Seuss Classic Oh, the Places You'll Go!), as well as the upcoming books of rhyming poetry The Three Jacks: A True Fable, and The Mog Tails of Stonegate & Newcastle.

References

Reviews
http://www.thechildrensbookreview.com/weblog/2010/04/alice-in-wonderland-j-t-holden-and-andrew-johnson%E2%80%94a-book-in-verse.html#more-5995

http://www.forewordreviews.com/reviews/alice-in-verse-the-lost-rhymes-of-wonderland/

http://www.midwestbookreview.com/sbw/mar_10.htm#Poetry

American male poets
Living people
Year of birth missing (living people)